Trifurcula teucriella is a moth of the  family Nepticulidae. It is found in southern France and Spain.

The larvae feed on Teucrium chamaedrys. They mine the leaves of their host plant. The mine consists of a corridor, widening into a blotch that may occupy the entire leaf. The larva may move to the opposite leaf through the petiole. Pupation takes place outside of the mine.

External links
bladmineerders.nl
Fauna Europaea

Nepticulidae
Moths of Europe
Moths described in 1914